Mythimna macrosaris is a moth of the family Noctuidae. It was first described by Edward Meyrick in 1899. It is endemic to the Hawaiian islands of Kauai, Oahu, Molokai and Hawaii.

The larvae mainly feed on Baumea meyenii, but have also been recorded feeding on Paspalum conjugatum, bunchgrass and sugarcane.

The caterpillar may often be found on the leaves of its host or hiding in the dead leaves and trash at its base. The caterpillars become full grown about a month after hatching from the eggs. The full-grown caterpillar is 42–45 mm.

The pupa is formed a little beneath the surface of the soil or under trash. The average pupa is about 22 mm
long and 6.5 mm thick. The pupal stage takes about three weeks.

External links

Mythimna (moth)
Endemic moths of Hawaii
Moths described in 1899